The fictional character Spider-Man, a comic book superhero created by Stan Lee and Steve Ditko and featured in Marvel Comics publications, has appeared as a main character in numerous theatrical and made-for-television films.

Nicholas Hammond first starred as Peter Parker / Spider-Man in the 1977 made-for-television film Spider-Man and would appear as the character two other times. In 1978, the Toei Company created a theatrical spin-off of their Spider-Man television series, with Shinji Todō reprising his role as Takuya Yamashiro / Spider-Man. By 1999, Sony Pictures Entertainment had acquired the film rights to the character, creating two film series until 2014: the Sam Raimi Spider-Man trilogy of films (2002–2007) starring Tobey Maguire as the character, and the Marc Webb Amazing Spider-Man films (2012–2014) starring Andrew Garfield in the role.

In February 2015, Disney, Marvel Studios, and Sony made a deal to share the Spider-Man film rights, leading to a new iteration of Spider-Man being introduced and integrated into the Marvel Cinematic Universe. The deal allowed Sony Pictures to continue to own, finance, distribute, and have final creative control of the solo Spider-Man films, with Walt Disney Studios Motion Pictures distributing the films with his other appearances in a supporting capacity. Tom Holland portrays this version of Spider-Man, and has appeared in six films to date, from Captain America: Civil War (2016) to Spider-Man: No Way Home (2021). In September 2019, following a brief stand-off resulting in the termination of the old agreement, Disney and Sony relented to fan outcry and reached a new agreement for Holland's version to return for future films such as another solo film, Spider-Man: No Way Home (2021) where he appears alongside Maguire and Garfield who reprise their roles in the film as supporting characters, and another team-up film. In December 2021, Feige confirmed that he and Pascal, along with Sony and Disney, are developing a fourth MCU Spider-Man film.

Plans for an animated Spider-Man film were officially announced by Sony in April 2015, which eventually became Spider-Man: Into the Spider-Verse (2018) from Sony Pictures Animation. Shameik Moore voices Miles Morales / Spider-Man in the film, along with various other versions of Peter Parker and alternate versions of Spider-Man from the multiverse also appearing. Sequels and potential spin-offs are planned.

The Spider-Man films have been generally well received. They have collectively grossed nearly $9.8 billion at the global box office, with Far From Home becoming the first Spider-Man film to gross over $1 billion worldwide followed by No Way Home, which became Sony's highest-grossing film of all time. Additionally, Into the Spider-Verse won the Academy Award for Best Animated Feature.

Early films

The Amazing Spider-Man series

Spider-Man (1977) 

In 1977, the pilot episode of The Amazing Spider-Man television series was released by Columbia Pictures as Spider-Man outside of the United States. It was directed by E. W. Swackhamer, written by Alvin Boretz and stars Nicholas Hammond as the titular character, David White as J. Jonah Jameson and Jeff Donnell as May Parker. The film premiered on CBS on September 14, 1977, and received a VHS release in 1980.

Spider-Man Strikes Back (1978) 

In 1978, the two-part episode "Deadly Dust" from the television series The Amazing Spider-Man was re-edited and released outside of the United States as a feature film, Spider-Man Strikes Back. Nicholas Hammond reprises his role as Peter Parker / Spider-Man while Robert F. Simon replaces David White in the role of J. Jonah Jameson. The film was theatrically released on 8 May 1978.

Spider-Man: The Dragon's Challenge (1981) 

In 1981, a film made from The Amazing Spider-Man television series finale "The Chinese Web", using the same method used to make Spider-Man Strikes Back, was released as Spider-Man: The Dragon's Challenge in European territories. Nicholas Hammond and Robert F. Simon respectively reprise their roles as Peter Parker / Spider-Man and J. Jonah Jameson. It was directed by Ron Satlof and written by Robert Janes. Other actors include Rosalind Chao, Benson Fong, and Ellen Bry.

Japanese film 

In 1978, Tōei released a theatrical spin-off of their Spider-Man TV series at the Tōei Cartoon Festival. The film was directed by Kōichi Takemoto, who also directed eight episodes of the TV series. The week after the film's release, a character introduced in the film, Jūzō Mamiya (played by Noboru Nakaya), began appearing in episodes of the TV series. The film was released on July 22, 1978. Like the rest of the series, the film was made available for streaming on Marvel's official website in 2009.

Development

Cannon Films
The low box office performance of 1983's Superman III made feature-film adaptations of comic book properties a low priority in Hollywood until the late 1990s. In 1985, after a brief option on Spider-Man by Roger Corman expired, Marvel Comics optioned the property to Cannon Films. Cannon chiefs Menahem Golan and his cousin Yoram Globus agreed to pay Marvel Comics $225,000 over the five-year option period, plus a percentage of any film's revenues. However, the rights would revert to Marvel if a film was not made by April 1990.

Tobe Hooper, then preparing both Invaders From Mars and The Texas Chainsaw Massacre 2, was mooted as director. Golan and Globus misunderstood the concept of the character ("They thought it was like The Wolf Man", said director Joseph Zito) and instructed writer Leslie Stevens, creator of The Outer Limits, to write a treatment reflecting their misconception. In Stevens' story, a corporate scientist intentionally subjects ID-badge photographer Peter Parker to radioactive bombardment, transforming him into a hairy, suicidal, eight-armed monster. This human tarantula refuses to join the scientist's new master-race of mutants, battling a succession of mutations kept in a basement laboratory.

Unhappy with this perceived debasement of his comic book creation, Marvel's Stan Lee pushed for a new story and screenplay, written for Cannon by Ted Newsom and John Brancato. The variation on the origin story had Otto Octavius as a teacher and mentor to a college-aged Peter Parker. The cyclotron accident which "creates" Spider-Man also deforms the scientist into Doctor Octopus and results in his mad pursuit of proof of the Fifth Force. "Doc Ock" reconstructs his cyclotron and causes electromagnetic abnormalities, anti-gravity effects, and bilocation which threatens to engulf New York City and the world. Joseph Zito, who had directed Cannon's successful Chuck Norris film Invasion USA, replaced Tobe Hooper. The new director hired Barney Cohen to rewrite the script. Cohen, creator of TV's Sabrina the Teenage Witch and Forever Knight, added action scenes, a non-canonical comic-book sidekick for the villain, gave Doc Ock the catch phrase, "Okey-dokey", and altered his goal from the Fifth Force to a quest for anti-gravity. Producer Golan (using his pen name "Joseph Goldman") then made a minor polish to Cohen's rewrite. Zito scouted locations and studio facilities in both the U.S. and Europe, and oversaw storyboard breakdowns supervised by Harper Goff. Cannon planned to make the film on the then-substantial budget of between $15 and $20 million.

While no casting was finalized, Zito expressed interest in actor/stunt man Scott Leva, who had posed for Cannon's promotional photos and ads, and made public appearances as Spider-Man for Marvel. The up-and-coming actor Tom Cruise was also discussed for the leading role. Zito considered Bob Hoskins as Doc Ock. Stan Lee expressed his desire to play Daily Bugle editor J. Jonah Jameson. Lauren Bacall and Katharine Hepburn were considered for Aunt May, Peter Cushing as a sympathetic scientist, and Adolph Caesar as a police detective. With Cannon finances siphoned by the expensive Superman IV: The Quest for Peace and Masters of the Universe, the company slashed the proposed Spider-Man budget to under $10 million. Director Zito opted out, unwilling to make a compromised Spider-Man. The company commissioned low-budget rewrites from writers Shepard Goldman, Don Michael Paul, and finally Ethan Wiley, and penciled in company workhorse Albert Pyun as director, who also made script alterations.

Scott Leva was still associated with the character through Marvel (he had appeared in photo covers of the comic), and he read each draft. Leva commented: "Ted Newsom and John Brancato had written the script. It was good, but it needed a little work. Unfortunately, with every subsequent rewrite by other writers, it went from good to bad to terrible." Due to Cannon's assorted financial crises, the project shut down after spending about $1.5 million on the project. In 1989, Pathé, owned by corrupt Italian financier Giancarlo Parretti, acquired the overextended Cannon. The filmmaking cousins parted, Globus remaining associated with Pathé, Golan leaving to run 21st Century Film Corporation, keeping a number of properties (including Spider-Man) in lieu of a cash buy-out. He also extended his Spider-Man option with Marvel up to January 1992.

Golan shelved the low-budget rewrites and attempted to finance an independent production from the original big-budget script, already budgeted, storyboarded and laid out. At Cannes in May 1989, 21st Century announced a September start date, with ads touting the script by "Barney Cohen, Ted Newsom & John Brancato and Joseph Goldman". As standard practice, Golan pre-sold the unmade film to raise production funds, with television rights bought by Viacom and home video rights by Columbia Pictures, which wanted to establish a studio franchise. Stephen Herek was attached as director at this point. Golan submitted this "new" screenplay to Columbia in late 1989 (actually the 1985 script with an adjusted "1989" date) and the studio requested yet another rewrite. Golan hired Frank LaLoggia, who turned in his draft but grew disenchanted with 21st Century. Neil Ruttenberg was hired for one more draft, which was also "covered" by script readers at Columbia. Columbia's script analysts considered all three submissions "essentially the same story". A tentative production deal was set. Stan Lee said in 1990: "21st Century [is] supposed to do Spider-Man and now they're talking to Columbia and the way it looks now, Columbia may end up buying Spider-Man from 21st Century."

Carolco Pictures / MGM
21st Century's Menahem Golan still actively immersed himself mounting "his" Spider-Man, sending the original "Doc Ock" script for production bids. In 1990, he contacted Canadian effects company Light and Motion Corporation regarding the visual effects, which in turn offered the stop-motion chores to Steven Archer (Krull, Clash of the Titans).

Toward the end of shooting True Lies, Variety carried the announcement that Carolco Pictures had received a completed screenplay from James Cameron. This script bore the names of James Cameron, John Brancato, Ted Newsom, Barry [sic] Cohen and "Joseph Goldmari", a typographical scrambling of Golan's pen name ("Joseph Goldman") with Marvel executive Joseph Calamari. The script text was identical to the one Golan submitted to Columbia the previous year, with the addition of a new 1993 date. Cameron stalwart Arnold Schwarzenegger was frequently linked to the project as the director's choice for Doctor Octopus.

James Cameron "scriptment"
Months later, James Cameron submitted an undated 57-page "scriptment" with an alternate story (the copyright registration was dated 1991), part screenplay, part narrative story outline. The "scriptment" told the Spider-Man origin, but used variations on the comic book characters Electro and Sandman as villains. This "Electro" (named Carlton Strand, instead of Max Dillon) was a megalomaniacal parody of corrupt capitalists. Instead of Flint Marko's character, Cameron's "Sandman" (simply named Boyd) is mutated by an accident involving Philadelphia Experiment-style bilocation and atom-mixing, in lieu of getting caught in a nuclear blast on a beach. The story climaxes with a battle atop the World Trade Center and had Peter Parker revealing his identity to Mary Jane Watson. In addition, the treatment was also heavy on profanity, and had Spider-Man and Mary Jane having sex on the Brooklyn Bridge.

This treatment reflected elements in previous scripts: from the Stevens treatment, organic web-shooters, and a villain who tempts Spider-Man to join a coming "master race" of mutants; from the original screenplay and rewrite, weird electrical storms causing blackouts, freak magnetic events and bi-location; from the Ethan Wiley draft, a villain addicted to toxic super-powers and multiple experimental spiders, one of which escapes and bites Peter, causing a hallucinatory nightmare invoking Franz Kafka's The Metamorphosis; from the Frank LaLoggia script, a blizzard of stolen cash fluttering down onto surprised New Yorkers; and from the Neil Ruttenberg screenplay, a criminal assault on the NYC Stock Exchange. In 1991, Carolco Pictures extended Golan's option agreement with Marvel through May 1996, but in April 1992, Carolco ceased active production on Spider-Man due to continued financial and legal problems. During this time Leonardo DiCaprio was considered for Peter Parker/Spider-Man; Maggie Smith as Aunt May; Robyn Lively as Mary Jane Watson; R. Lee Ermey as J. Jonah Jameson; Michael Biehn as Boyd/Sandman; and Lance Henriksen as Carlton Strand/Electro.

Litigation
When James Cameron agreed to make Spider-Man, Carolco lawyers simply used his previous Terminator 2 contract as a template. A clause in this agreement gave Cameron the right to decide on movie and advertising credits. Show business trade articles and advertisements made no mention of Golan, who was still actively assembling the elements for the film. In 1993, Golan complained publicly and finally instigated legal action against Carolco for disavowing his contractual guarantee credit as producer. On the other hand, Cameron had the contractual right to decide on credits. Eventually, Carolco sued Viacom and Columbia to recover broadcast and home video rights, and the two studios countersued. 20th Century Fox, though not part of the litigation, contested Cameron's participation, claiming exclusivity on his services as a director under yet another contract. In 1996, Carolco, 21st Century, and Marvel went bankrupt.

Via a quitclaim from Carolco dated March 28, 1995, MGM acquired 21st Century's film library and assets, and received "...all rights in and to all drafts and versions of the screenplay(s) for Spider-Man written by James Cameron, Ted Newsom & John Brancato, Menahem Golan, Jon [sic] Michael Paul, Ethan Wiley, Leslie Stevens, Frank Laloggia, Neil Ruttenberg, Barney Cohen, Shepard Goldman and any and all other writers." MGM also sued 21st Century, Viacom, and Marvel Comics, alleging fraud in the original deal between Cannon and Marvel. In 1998, Marvel emerged from bankruptcy with a reorganization plan that merged the company with Toy Biz. The courts determined that the original contract of Marvel's rights to Golan had expired, returning the rights to Marvel, but the matter was still not completely resolved. In 1999, Marvel licensed Spider-Man rights to Columbia, a subsidiary of Sony Pictures Entertainment. MGM disputed the legality, claiming it had the Spider-Man rights via Cannon, 21st Century, and Carolco.

Columbia Pictures

In the meantime, MGM/UA chief executive John Calley moved to Columbia Pictures. Intimately familiar with the legal history of producer Kevin McClory's claim to the rights to both Thunderball and other related James Bond characters and elements, Calley announced that Columbia would produce an alternate 007 series, based on the "McClory material", which Calley acquired for Columbia. Columbia had made the original 1967 film spoof of Casino Royale, a non-Eon production.

Both studios now faced rival projects, which could undercut their own long-term financial stability and plans. Columbia had no consistent movie franchise, and had sought Spider-Man since 1989; MGM/UA's only reliable source of theatrical income was a new James Bond film every two or three years. An alternate 007 series could diminish or even eliminate the power of MGM/UA's long-running Bond series. Likewise, an MGM/UA Spider-Man film could negate Columbia's plans to create an exclusive cash cow. Both sides seemed to have strong arguments for the rights to do such films.

The two studios made a trade-off in March 1999; Columbia relinquished its rights to create a new 007 series in exchange for MGM's giving up its claim to Spider-Man. Columbia acquired the rights to all previous scripts in 2000, but exercised options only on the "Cameron Material", i.e., both the completed multi-author screenplay and the subsequent scriptment. Other sources report that Columbia's owner Sony agreed to pay $10 million, plus 5% of any movies' gross revenue and half the revenue from consumer products. After more than a decade of attempts, Spider-Man truly went into production and since then all of the Spider-Man films were distributed by Columbia Pictures, the primary film production holding of Sony. The first three were directed by Sam Raimi, and the reboot and its sequel were directed by Marc Webb. Laura Ziskin served as producer until her death in 2011.

Sam Raimi films

Spider-Man (2002)

Spider-Man follows Peter Parker (Tobey Maguire), an orphaned high schooler who pines after popular girl-next-door Mary Jane Watson (Kirsten Dunst). While on a science class field trip at Columbia University, a genetically-engineered "super spider" bites Peter. As a result, Peter gains superhuman abilities, including increased strength, speed, and the abilities to scale walls and generate organic webbing. After his beloved Uncle Ben (Cliff Robertson) is murdered, the teenager realizes that he must use his newfound abilities to protect New York City. Meanwhile, wealthy industrialist Norman Osborn (Willem Dafoe), the father of Peter's best friend Harry Osborn (James Franco), subjects himself to an experimental performance-enhancing serum, which creates a psychotic and murderous split personality. Donning a military battle suit, Norman becomes a freakish "Green Goblin", who begins to terrorize the city. Peter, as Spider-Man, now must battle with the Goblin, all while dealing with personal situations involving his domestic and his love life.

Spider-Man 2 (2004)

Two years after the events of the first film, Peter struggles to balance his superhero and private lives and still pines after Mary Jane Watson, who is now engaged. Harry Osborn continues to believe Spider-Man is responsible for his father Norman Osborn's death. Spider-Man contends with scientist Otto Octavius (Alfred Molina), also known as Doctor Octopus, who initially mentors his alter-ego and has four mechanical tentacles fused to his spine following a failed fusion-based experiment and sets out to recreate the same that could destroy much of New York City.

Spider-Man 3 (2007)

Spider-Man 3 picks up a year after the events of the second film. Peter is still with Mary Jane Watson, while Harry Osborn succeeds his father as the new Green Goblin (credited as New Goblin). Eddie Brock (Topher Grace), who, like Peter, is a photographer for the Daily Bugle, sets out to defame Spider-Man and incriminate him. Meanwhile, Flint Marko (Thomas Haden Church), an escaped convict, falls into a particle accelerator and becomes a shape-shifting sand monster known as Sandman. Peter later learns that Marko killed Uncle Ben, causing Peter's own dark intentions to grow. This vendetta is enhanced by the appearance of the mysterious black alien symbiotic substance that bonds to Peter, resulting in the formation of a new black costume. Once Peter separates himself from the alien, it finds a new host in the form of Brock, resulting in the creation of Venom and Peter Parker having to battle the villains in the end.

Canceled fourth film and potential revival
In 2007, Spider-Man 4 entered development, with Raimi attached to direct and Maguire, Dunst and other cast members set to reprise their roles. Both a fourth and a fifth film were planned and at one time the idea of shooting the two sequels concurrently was under consideration. However, Raimi stated in March 2009 that only the fourth film was in development at that time, and that if there were fifth and sixth films, those two films would actually be a continuation of each other. Zodiac screenwriter James Vanderbilt was hired by Sony Pictures in October 2007 to pen the screenplay after initial reports in January that Sony was in contact with David Koepp, who wrote the first Spider-Man film. The script was being rewritten by David Lindsay-Abaire and Gary Ross in November 2008 and October 2009. Sony also engaged Vanderbilt to write scripts for Spider-Man 5 and Spider-Man 6.

In 2007, Raimi expressed interest in depicting the transformation of Dr. Curt Connors into his villainous alter-ego, the Lizard; the character's actor Dylan Baker and producer Grant Curtis were also enthusiastic about the idea. Raimi also discussed his desire to upgrade Bruce Campbell from a cameo appearance to a significant role, later revealed to be Quentin Beck / Mysterio. It was reported in December 2009 that John Malkovich was in negotiations to play Vulture and that Anne Hathaway would play Felicia Hardy, though she would not have transformed into the Black Cat as in the comics. Instead, Raimi's Felicia was expected to become a new superpowered figure called the Vulturess. Several years later, in 2013, Raimi said that Hathaway was going to be Black Cat if Spider-Man 4 had been made. Concept art by storyboard artist Jeffrey Henderson revealed in June 2016 showed the inclusion of an opening montage of Spider-Man going up against C and D-list villains, such as Mysterio, the Shocker, the Prowler, the Stilt-Man and the Rhino, with the Vulture serving as the main antagonist; Henderson recalls that the film would have opened with a montage of Spider-Man, now feeling free after breaking up with Mary Jane, catching all villains from his rogues gallery that the crew knew Raimi would never use in his films. Henderson also disclosed that Malkovich would have played the Vulture, who would have been a private contractor who committed terrible actions in behalf of the U.S. government, leading him to be called the "Vulture" because he never left anything but "bones" behind, and the film's climax would have shown the Vulture and Spider-Man fighting in a bloody fight that Spider-Man would have barely won by causing the Vulture's wings to make him tumble between building until crashing into the Citicorp Building's ether and off its top, killing him. In April 2022, Raimi stated that he had planned to include Kraven the Hunter in the film.

As disagreements between Sony and Raimi threatened to push the film off the intended May 6, 2011 release date, Sony Pictures announced in January 2010 that plans for Spider-Man 4 had been canceled due to Raimi's withdrawal from the project. Raimi reportedly ended his participation due to his doubt that he could meet the planned May 6, 2011 release date while at the same time upholding the film creatively; he admitted that he was "very unhappy" with the way Spider-Man 3 had turned out, and was under pressure to make the fourth film the best that he could. Raimi purportedly went through four iterations of the script with different screenwriters and still "hated it".

In June 2021, animatic producer David E. Duncan who worked on Spider-Man 4 uploaded an animatic of the canceled project dated November 12th, 2009 to his Vimeo account along with the description: "One of a half dozen animatics I produced for the ill-fated 4th Raimi Spider-Man. Studio politics, creative differences and bad internet reactions (to John Malkovich as Vulture) caused the plug to be pulled December of 2009, early in the prep stage. However, one month later, Sony moved forward with Andrew Garfield reboot...", the animatic depicts a battle between Spider-Man and The Vulture. Duncan later deleted the animatic from his page, but it can still be found on YouTube.

Following his appearance in No Way Home, some fans called for Sony to make a fourth Tobey Maguire Spider-Man film using the hashtag "#MakeRaimiSpiderMan4" on Twitter. In addition, both director Sam Raimi and actress Kirsten Dunst expressed interest in a possible return in a fourth film, while Tobey Maguire stated that he is "open for anything". However, Raimi later stated that he had no plans to direct such a film.

Marc Webb films

Following the cancelation of Spider-Man 4, Sony announced that the franchise would be rebooted with a new director and new cast. Marc Webb directed both of the Amazing Spider-Man films.

The Amazing Spider-Man (2012)

The film focuses on Peter Parker (Andrew Garfield) developing his abilities in high school and his relationship with Gwen Stacy (Emma Stone). He fights the Lizard, the monstrous form of Dr. Curt Connors (Rhys Ifans), his father's former partner and a scientist at Oscorp.

The Amazing Spider-Man 2 (2014)

The film takes place two years after the first film's events. Peter Parker graduates from high school, continues his crime-fighting duties as Spider-Man, while combating the electricity-manipulating Electro (Jamie Foxx), rekindling his relationship with Gwen Stacy, and encountering his old friend Harry Osborn (Dane DeHaan), who is slowly dying from a genetic disease.

Canceled third film, spin-offs, and potential revival
In June 2013, Sony Pictures announced the release dates for the next two Spider-Man films. The third film was scheduled to be released on June 10, 2016, and the fourth to be released on May 4, 2018. Paul Giamatti confirmed that Rhino would return in the third film. That November, Sony Pictures Entertainment chief Michael Lynton told analysts: "We do very much have the ambition about creating a bigger universe around Spider-Man. There are a number of scripts in the works." Andrew Garfield stated that his contract was for three films, and was unsure of his involvement for the fourth film. In February 2014, Sony announced that Webb would return to direct the third Amazing Spider-Man film. In March, Webb stated that he would not be directing the fourth film, but would like to remain as a consultant for the series. Roberto Orci told IGN in July that he was not working on the third film due to his involvement in Star Trek Beyond. Alex Kurtzman stated in interview that the third film was still continuing production and that there was a possibility of seeing a Black Cat film. Sony Pictures later announced in July that The Amazing Spider-Man 3 had been delayed to 2018. After the announcement in February 2015 of a new series with Marvel Studios, the sequels to The Amazing Spider-Man 2 were canceled. In July 2015, Denis Leary, who had portrayed police Captain George Stacy in the previous two films, revealed that the film at one point had Spider-Man "take this formula and regenerate the people in his life that died."

In December 2013, Sony issued a press release through the viral site Electro Arrives announcing that two films were in development, with Alex Kurtzman, Roberto Orci and Ed Solomon writing a spin-off to The Amazing Spider-Man focused on Venom (with Kurtzman attached to direct) and Drew Goddard writing one focused on the villain team Sinister Six. Hannah Minghella and Rachel O'Connor would oversee the development and production of these films for the studio. The Venom spinoff eventually became the 2018 film starring the character. In April 2014, it was announced that Goddard would direct the Sinister Six film, and that both spin-offs would be released before a fourth Amazing Spider-Man, with Spider-Man potentially appearing in both spin-offs. Later in the month, Tolmach and Arad revealed the Sinister Six film would be a redemption story, and that the film's lineup might differ from the comics. On July 23, 2014, Sony Pictures announced that The Sinister Six was scheduled for release on November 11, 2016. By August 2014, Sony was also looking to release a female-centered spin-off film in 2017, with Lisa Joy writing, and had given the Venom spin-off the potential title of Venom: Carnage.

Despite the announcement in February 2015 of a new series with Marvel Studios, the Sinister Six, Venom, and female-led spin-off films set in the Amazing Spider-Man timeline were then "still moving forward". Feige was not expected to be creatively involved with these films. However, the Sinister Six film was canceled due to The Amazing Spider-Man 2 underperforming commercially, and by November 2015, the other prospective spin-off films were canceled as well. However, Sony has reworked these plans into creating a new film series based on Marvel characters associated with Spider-Man separate from both the Marvel Cinematic Universe or the Amazing Spider-Man franchise, starting with the release of the 2018 film Venom. These include spinoff films centering around the characters of Morbius, Kraven the Hunter, and Silver and Black, a female-centric team up of the Spider-Man anti-heroes Silver Sable and Black Cat. Jared Leto portrayed the title character Morbius in the spin-off film, directed by Daniel Espinosa and was released on April 1, 2022, to critical and commercial failure. Kraven the Hunter was written by Richard Wenk, and has a set release date of October 6, 2023.

Following his appearance in No Way Home, some fans called for Sony to make a third Andrew Garfield Spider-Man film using the hashtag "#MakeTASM3" on Twitter. In an interview with Entertainment Tonight, Garfield expressed interest in reprising his role as his Peter Parker for another Spider-Man film. Tom Holland later expressed support for Garfield to reprise the role in a potential third film.

Licensing agreement with Marvel Studios

Sony's 1998 license, covering all Spider-Man films (including 900 characters related to Spider-Man), is perpetual provided that Sony releases a new Spider-Man film at least once every 5.75 years.

Sometime in 2014, prior to the release of The Amazing Spider-Man 2, there had been informal discussions between Amy Pascal and Marvel Studios president Kevin Feige about whether the world and characters of The Amazing Spider-Man films (including Andrew Garfield's version of Spider-Man) could be retroactively integrated into the Marvel Cinematic Universe (MCU), but discussions came to nothing. Pascal and Avi Arad had attempted to connect the two franchises prior to these discussions, with the pair revealing that they were intending on licensing out the design of the Oscorp Tower from The Amazing Spider-Man (2012) so it could appear in the New York City skyline of the MCU film The Avengers (2012), establishing the existence of Spider-Man and associated elements in the MCU. It never materialized as a result of the building's design being finalized too late into the latter film's post-production process. Sony also mooted with the idea of doing a crossover film between The Amazing Spider-Man films and the Sam Raimi films with Garfield and Tobey Maguire playing their respective versions of Spider-Man with Raimi reportedly eyed to direct, but this too never came to fruition. In December 2014, following the hacking of Sony Pictures' computers, Sony and Marvel Studios were revealed to have had discussions about allowing Spider-Man to appear in the MCU film Captain America: Civil War (2016) while having control of the film rights remaining with Sony. Talks between the studios then broke down. Instead, Sony had considered having Raimi return to direct a new trilogy.

On February 9, 2015, Sony Pictures and Marvel Studios announced that Spider-Man would appear in the MCU, with the character appearing in an MCU film and Sony releasing a Spider-Man film co-produced by Feige and Pascal. Sony Pictures would continue to own, finance, distribute, and exercise final creative control over the Spider-Man films. Feige stated that Marvel had been working to add Spider-Man to the MCU since at least October 2014. The next month, Marvel Entertainment CCO Joe Quesada indicated that the Peter Parker version of the character would be used, which Feige confirmed in April. The following June, Feige clarified that the initial Sony deal did not allow the character to appear in any of the MCU television series, as it was "very specific... with a certain amount of back and forth allowed."

Tom Holland, who portrays Peter Parker / Spider-Man in the MCU, revealed in November 2016 that he was signed for "three Spider-Man movies and three solo movies". In June 2017, Holland, Feige, and Jon Watts, director of the MCU Spider-Man films, confirmed that a child (portrayed by Max Favreau) wearing an Iron Man mask whom Tony Stark saves from a drone in Iron Man 2 (2010), was a young Peter Parker, retroactively making it the introduction of the character to the MCU.

In August 2019, Disney and Sony couldn't reach a new agreement regarding Spider-Man films, with Marvel Studios and Feige said to no longer have any involvement in any future films. Deadline Hollywood noted that Disney had hoped future films would be a "50/50 co-financing arrangement between the studios", with the possibility to extend the deal to other Spider-Man-related films, an offer Sony rejected and did not counter. Instead, Sony hoped to keep the terms of the previous agreement, where Marvel would receive 5% of the film's initial theatrical gross, with Disney refusing. The Hollywood Reporter added that the lack of a new agreement would see the end of Holland's Spider-Man in the MCU. Variety cited unnamed sources claiming negotiations had "hit an impasse" and that a new deal could still be reached. On August 24, Feige reportedly commented at Disney's D23 Expo: "We got to make five films within the MCU with Spider-Man: two standalone films and three with the Avengers. It was a dream that I never thought would happen. It was never meant to last forever. We knew there was a finite amount of time that we’d be able to do this, and we told the story we wanted to tell, and I’ll always be thankful for that."

The following month, in response to fan outcry, Disney and Sony reached a new deal, which includes a third Spider-Man film as well as one other film, both set in the MCU. At the time, Watts entered final negotiations to return as director. In November 2021, Pascal revealed in an interview that Sony and Marvel Studios are going to continue collaborating for another trilogy of films set in the MCU.

Captain America: Civil War (2016)

Reports indicated that the first MCU film that Spider-Man would appear in as part of the deal, would be Captain America: Civil War. Directors Joe and Anthony Russo had lobbied for months to include the character in that film. Anthony Russo stated that, despite Marvel telling them to have a "plan B" should the deal with Sony fail, the Russos never created one because "it was very important to us to reintroduce" Spider-Man in the film, adding, "We only have envisioned the movie with Spider-Man." By the end of May 2015, Asa Butterfield, Tom Holland, Judah Lewis, Matthew Lintz, Charlie Plummer and Charlie Rowe screen tested for the lead role, against Robert Downey Jr., who portrays Tony Stark / Iron Man, for chemistry. The six were chosen out of a search of over 1,500 actors to test in front of Feige, Pascal, and the Russo brothers. In June, Feige and Pascal narrowed the actors considered to Holland and Rowe. Both screen tested again with Downey, with Holland also testing with Chris Evans, who portrays Steve Rogers / Captain America, and emerged as the favorite. Holland was ultimately cast as Spider-Man in June. The following month, Marisa Tomei was in talks for the role of May Parker, later appearing in Civil War.

In the film, Parker, who has spent the last six months as a local costumed crimefighter named Spider-Man, is recruited by Stark to join his team of Avengers to stop Rogers and his rogue faction of Avengers, who oppose the Sokovia Accords, from fleeing with fugitive Bucky Barnes. During the fight with Rogers and his team, Parker, utilizing a Stark-upgraded version of his initial makeshift suit, proves to be a formidable opponent, and implements a tactic with which he, Stark, James Rhodes / War Machine and Vision disable Scott Lang / Ant-Man in his giant-sized form. Upon returning home, Parker discovers some of the Stark tech features of the suit he was given by Stark.

Spider-Man: Homecoming (2017)

Spider-Man: Homecoming was released on July 7, 2017. The film was directed by Jon Watts, from a screenplay by Jonathan M. Goldstein & John Francis Daley and Watts & Christopher Ford and Chris McKenna & Erik Sommers. Holland, Tomei, and Downey reprise their roles as Peter Parker, May Parker, and Stark, respectively, and are joined by Michael Keaton as Adrian Toomes / Vulture, Zendaya as MJ, Jacob Batalon as Ned Leeds, Laura Harrier as Liz, Tony Revolori as Flash Thompson, and Bokeem Woodbine as Herman Schultz / Shocker, who appears as a minor villain. Jon Favreau also appears as Happy Hogan, reprising his role from the Iron Man films. Production began in June 2016 in Atlanta, Georgia and ended in October.

Set two months after the events of Civil War, Parker anxiously awaits his next assignment from Stark while simultaneously balancing his life at Midtown High with his vigilante life as Spider-Man. His investigation of a series of highly weaponized robberies leads him to mysterious weapons trafficker Adrian Toomes and despite Stark's warnings not to be involved attempts to stop him.

Avengers: Infinity War (2018)

In October 2016, Holland said the possibility of him appearing in Avengers: Infinity War was "all up in the air", but that "some sort of deal is in the mix" with Sony for him to appear. Holland was eventually confirmed to appear in the film, directed by the Russo brothers, as part of the ensemble cast in February 2017.

Parker joins Iron Man, Doctor Strange, and the Guardians of the Galaxy in battling Thanos in the ruins of his home planet, Titan. However, Parker is among the many heroes who perish after Thanos snaps his fingers with a completed Infinity Gauntlet, which wipes out half of all life in the universe.

Avengers: Endgame (2019) 

Holland was confirmed to be a part of Avengers: Endgame, directed by the Russo brothers, in April 2017.

After dying at the end of Infinity War, Parker along with the other victims of Thanos are resurrected by Bruce Banner five years later and joins the Avengers and their allies in a clash against Thanos and his army in upstate New York. At the battle's conclusion, Parker mourns Stark's death and attends his funeral with Aunt May before returning to high school to reunite with his best friend Ned.

Spider-Man: Far From Home (2019)

In December 2016, Sony Pictures announced a sequel to Spider-Man: Homecoming, for release on July 5, 2019. In June 2017, Feige stated that the film would be titled in a similar fashion to Homecoming, using a subtitle, and would not have a number in the title. A year later, Holland revealed the film's title as Spider-Man: Far From Home. Watts returned to direct, and Holland, Zendaya, Favreau, Batalon, Tomei, and Revolori reprise their roles from Homecoming, with Jake Gyllenhaal joining as Quentin Beck / Mysterio. As in Homecoming, other characters from MCU installments reprise their roles, with Samuel L. Jackson and Cobie Smulders appearing as Nick Fury and Maria Hill, respectively. In April 2019, Sony Pictures moved the release date to July 2, 2019.

Set after the events of Endgame, the film features Parker and his friends going to Europe on summer vacation, where Parker, intending to take a break from superheroics is drawn back to it when he is forced to team up with Fury and Mysterio in battling the Elementals.

Spider-Man: No Way Home (2021)

In September 2019, Marvel Studios and Sony Pictures announced to produce a third film, after an impasse between the two companies during negotiations. Watts returned to direct, from a script by McKenna and Sommers. Holland, Zendaya, Favreau, Batalon, Tomei, and Revolori reprise their roles, and are joined by Benedict Cumberbatch and Benedict Wong in their MCU roles as Stephen Strange and Wong, respectively, with the events of this film tying into Doctor Strange in the Multiverse of Madness (2022). The film links the pre-MCU Spider-Man films via the multiverse and features Tobey Maguire and Andrew Garfield reprise their respective roles as their versions of Spider-Man, while Willem Dafoe, Alfred Molina and Thomas Haden Church reprise their roles as Norman Osborn / Green Goblin, Otto Octavius / Doctor Octopus and Flint Marko / Sandman respectively from Sam Raimi's Spider-Man trilogy, along with Jamie Foxx and Rhys Ifans as Max Dillon / Electro and Curt Connors / Lizard respectively from Marc Webb's The Amazing Spider-Man films. Charlie Cox reprises his role as Matt Murdock from Marvel Television's Netflix series and Tom Hardy appears, uncredited, as Eddie Brock, reprising the role from Sony's Spider-Man Universe.

After Mysterio exposes Parker's identity as Spider-Man to the world in Far From Home in addition to incriminating him for his demise, ruining Parker's and his close ones' life in the process, Parker asks Strange to make it a secret again with magic, but this inadvertently breaks open the multiverse and allows visitors from alternate realities to enter Parker's universe.

Future
Amy Pascal confirmed plans for a sequel to Spider-Man: No Way Home and a second trilogy of films set in the MCU in November 2021 ahead of the film's release, with Kevin Feige confirming the active development of a fourth MCU Spider-Man film in addition to his next supporting appearance in the franchise the following month. Marvel Studios will return to co-produce the film with Sony Pictures and Pascal Pictures. Tom Holland is expected to reprise his role, with his character undergoing a soft-reset as a result of his "momentous decision" during No Way Home's climax, as insinuated by the final line of the screenplay of No Way Home reading: "Peter Parker is no more, but Spider-Man lives on", describing public knowledge of the character's civilian persona being erased by Doctor Strange's spell.

Animated Spider-Verse

Spider-Man: Into the Spider-Verse (2018)

In April 2015, Sony announced that Phil Lord and Christopher Miller were writing and producing a Spider-Man animated comedy in development at Sony Pictures Animation. As revealed by the e-mail leak one year before, the duo had been previously courted by Sony to take over the studio's animation division. Originally scheduled to be released on December 21, 2018, Sony changed the date a week earlier on December 14. Sony Pictures Animation president Kristine Belson unveiled the film's logo, with the working title Animated Spider-Man, at CinemaCon 2016, and declared that "conceptually and visually, [the film] will break new ground for the superhero genre." Bob Persichetti would direct the animated film, with Peter Ramsey and Rodney Rothman serving as co-directors and Miles Morales as the protagonist in the film.

Spider-Ham: Caught in a Ham (2019)

Into the Spider-Verse producers Phil Lord and Christopher Miller expressed interest in developing animated shorts starring Spider-Ham. The short film Spider-Ham: Caught in a Ham was released on February 26, 2019, along with the digital release of Into the Spider-Verse.

Spider-Man: Across the Spider-Verse (2023)

In November 2018, it was revealed that Into the Spider-Verse had entered into sequel development. The sequel, which will continue Morales' story and feature a romance with Gwen Stacy / Spider-Gwen, is set to be directed by Joaquim Dos Santos and written by David Callaham. In February 2021, Christopher Miller revealed that both he and Phil Lord are co-writing the screenplay with Callaham, and that Peter Ramsey would serve as an executive producer, after co-directing the first film. By April, Kemp Powers and Justin K. Thompson (the latter of which had previously served as production designer on the first film) were announced to direct the film with Dos Santos. In April 2022, it was announced that the film had been retitled, with the (Part One) moniker removed in favor of separating the film and its sequel. It is scheduled for release on June 2, 2023 after being delayed from its initial October 7, 2022 release date.

Spider-Man: Beyond the Spider-Verse (2024)
In December 2021, Lord and Miller revealed that the film was being split into two parts after they had written down the story they wanted to tell for the sequel and realized that it was too much for a single film. Work on both parts was taking place simultaneously. The film is expected to be released on March 29, 2024 after being delayed from its initial release window of 2023.

Potential projects
Along with the announcement of a sequel, a spin-off focused on female Spider-characters was revealed to be in development, with Lauren Montgomery in talks to direct the film, while Bek Smith is set to write. The spin-off will star Spider-Gwen, and is set to feature the characters Cindy Moon / Silk and Jessica Drew / Spider-Woman. Producer Amy Pascal felt that "it’s great that we're going to be able to tell movies about female superheroes in this realm" as she believes "there are going to be characters that really resonate for people". On how the spin-off film will be connected to Across the Spider-Verse, Pascal said that it will act as a "launching pad" for the spin-off. Hailee Steinfeld expressed interest in reprising her role as Spider-Gwen in the film.

John Mulaney expressed interest in a spin-off film starring Spider-Ham, with the potential plot being a "Watergate-like story" which could focus on the character's career as a reporter.<ref>{{cite web|url=https://variety.com/2018/film/news/spiderham-spiderman-john-mulaney-1203092130/|title=John Mulaney's Pitch for 'Spider-Ham' Film: Spotlight' … but Family Friendly'|first=Matt|last=Donnelly|website=Variety|date=December 18, 2018}}</ref>

Sony's Spider-Man Universe

Work on an expanded universe using supporting characters from the Spider-Man films began by December 2013. After the relative critical and financial failure of The Amazing Spider-Man 2, these plans were abandoned and in February 2015, Sony announced a deal to collaborate with Marvel Studios on future Spider-Man films and integrate the character into the Marvel Cinematic Universe (MCU). This relationship produced Spider-Man: Homecoming, Spider-Man: Far From Home, and Spider-Man: No Way Home, while Sony separately redeveloped Venom (2018) as a standalone film beginning a new franchise named Sony's Spider-Man Universe (SSU). The franchise continued with Venom: Let There Be Carnage (2021) and Morbius (2022), both of which established that the MCU and SSU would be connected through the multiverse, a concept previously explored in No Way Home.

The mid-credits scene of Let There Be Carnage sees Eddie Brock and Venom transported from their hotel to an unfamiliar location and witnesses the MCU version of J. Jonah Jameson talking about Spider-Man's identity as Peter Parker. This is continued in the mid-credits scene of No Way Home, where Brock and Venom are transported back into his original universe, leaving a small piece of Venom behind.

Michael Keaton reprises his Spider-Man: Homecoming role as Adrian Toomes / Vulture during the post-credits scenes in Morbius.  Following the casting of Doctor Strange's second spell permanently erasing the world's knowledge of Peter Parker's civilian identity, Toomes is accidentally transported from the MCU to the SSU, ending up in a vacated prison cell in the latter universe. Upon being released immediately due to lacking a criminal record in the new universe, Toomes begins to surmise Spider-Man's involvement in his displacement. He soon constructs a new Vulture suit and arranges to meet Dr. Michael Morbius, to whom he proposes they form a team.

Other films
 Marvel Super Heroes 4D (2010) 

On May 31, 2010, an animated 4D film, titled Marvel Super Heroes 4D, was launched at Madame Tussauds London, featuring Spider-Man and Iron Man leading the Avengers against Doctor Doom. On April 26, 2012, an updated version of the film with a different plot, featuring Spider-Man in a diminished capacity, was opened at Madame Tussauds New York. The film features Tom Kenny as the voice of Peter Parker / Spider-Man.

Phineas and Ferb: Mission Marvel (2013)

At Comic-Con 2013, Dan Buckley, president of Marvel Worldwide, Inc announced the development of a crossover television film of the animated series Phineas and Ferb, that would feature characters from Marvel Entertainment. The film aired between August 16–25, 2013 on Disney Channel and Disney XD, featuring Drake Bell reprising his role from Ultimate Spider-Man and Avengers Assemble as Peter Parker / Spider-Man, alongside Danny Trejo as Venom.

Recurring cast and characters

Stan Lee, one of the co-creators of Spider-Man, appeared in varied cameos in all films from the Raimi-trilogy to Into the Spider-Verse. Bruce Campbell, a long-time colleague of Sam Raimi, appeared in all three of his films. In Spider-Man, he was the announcer at the wrestling ring Peter was in and gave him the name "Spider-Man", instead of the "Human Spider" (the name with which Peter wanted to be introduced). In Spider-Man 2, he was an usher who refuses to let Peter enter the theatre for Mary Jane's play when arriving late. In Spider-Man 3, Campbell appears as a French maître d'. In the ultimately unmade Spider-Man 4, Campbell's character would have been revealed as Quentin Beck / Mysterio. Mysterio would later appear in Spider-Man: Far From Home (2019) played by Jake Gyllenhaal.

Additional crew
{|class="wikitable" style="text-align:center; width:99%;"
|-
! width=10% rowspan="3" | Films
! colspan="8" | Live-action
! colspan="2" | Animated
|-
! width:10%;" | Spider-Man! width:10%;" | Spider-Man 2! width:10%;" | Spider-Man 3! width:10%;" | Spider-Man! width:10%;" | Spider-Man 2! width:10%;" | Spider-Man:! width:10%;" | Spider-Man:! width:10%;" | Spider-Man:! width:10%;" | Spider-Man:! width:10%;" | Spider-Man:
|-
! 2002
! 2004
! 2007
! 2012
! 2014
! 2017
! 2019
! 2021
! 2018
! 2023
|-
! Executiveproducer(s)
| Avi AradStan Lee
| colspan="2" | Stan LeeKevin FeigeJoseph M. Caracciolo
| Stan LeeKevin FeigeMichael Grillo
| E. Bennett WalshStan LeeAlex KurtzmanRoberto Orci
| Louis D'EspositoVictoria AlonsoPatricia WhitcherJeremy LatchamAvi AradMatt TolmachStan Lee
| Louis D'EspositoVictoria AlonsoThomas M. HammelEric Hauserman CarrollRachel O'ConnorStan LeeAvi AradMatt Tolmach
| Louis D'EspositoVictoria AlonsoJoAnn PerritanoRachel O'ConnorAvi AradMatt Tolmach
| Will AllegraBrian Michael BendisStan Lee
| Bob PersichettiPeter RamseyRodney RothmanAditya SoodRebecca KarchBrian Michael Bendis
|-
! Composer(s)
| colspan="2" | Danny Elfman
| Christopher Young
| James Horner
| Hans ZimmerThe Magnificent Six
| colspan="3" | Michael Giacchino
| colspan="2" | Daniel Pemberton
|-
! Director of photography
| Don Burgess
| colspan="2" |Bill Pope
| John Schwartzman
| Dan Mindel
| Salvatore Totino
| Matthew J. Lloyd
| Mauro Fiore
| 
| 
|-
! Editor(s)
| Bob MurawskiArthur Coburn
| colspan="2" |Bob Murawski
| Alan Edward BellMichael McCuskerPietro Scalia
| Pietro Scalia
| Dan LebentalDebbie Berman
| Dan LebentalLeigh Folsom-Boyd
| Jeffrey FordLeigh Folsom Boyd
| Robert Fisher Jr.
| 
|}

Home media
The Sam Raimi trilogy was released on DVD, the first two being released exclusively as two-disc sets and on VHS, with the third film being released in both single and two-disc editions. All three films were later packaged in a "Motion Picture DVD Trilogy" box set.

Spider-Man 3 was initially the only Spider-Man film to be released individually on the high-definition Blu-ray format. The first two films were made available on Blu-ray, but only as part of a boxed set with the third film, called Spider-Man: The High-Definition Trilogy. The first two films lacked the bonus features from the DVDs, although Spider-Man 2 did contain both cuts of the film.

Sony re-released the three films on June 12, 2012. The DVDs of the first two films reinstated a selection of the bonus features missing from the earlier Blu-ray releases, although the Spider-Man 3 reissue did not include the bonus disc of additional special features that appeared on earlier Blu-ray releases.

All three films which comprise the Raimi-trilogy are available in the U.S. on iTunes.

The Amazing Spider-Man 2 became the first Spider-Man movie released on Ultra HD Blu-ray on March 1, 2016. Sony released the home video release of Homecoming on UHD and other home video formats on October 17, 2017, as well as sets featuring all of their other Spider-Man movies on UHD. This included Spider-Man: Limited Edition Collection, which includes all three Raimi films, and The Amazing Spider-Man: Limited Edition Collection, which includes both Webb films.

In April 2021, Disney and Sony Pictures reached a multi-year deal to let Sony's titles (such as films from the Spider-Man, Jumanji, as well as Hotel Transylvania and other Sony Pictures Animation franchises, and anime licensed by Funimation/Crunchyroll like Attack on Titan and Fate/stay night: Unlimited Blade Works) stream on Hulu and Disney+. A significant number of Sony titles began streaming on Hulu starting in June 2021.  It includes films from 2022 onwards. While the deal only concerns the United States, titles from Sony Pictures begun to also be added to Disney+ in regions outside of the U.S., as early as June 2022, starting with the majority of the Spider-Man films.

Reception

Box office

All three films of the Raimi-trilogy set opening day records in North America. The Spider-Man films are among the top of North American rankings of films based on Marvel Comics, with Spider-Man: No Way Home ranking 2nd, Spider-Man ranking 10th, Spider-Man: Far From Home ranking 11th, Spider-Man 2 ranking 13th, Spider-Man 3 ranking 15th, and Spider-Man: Homecoming ranking 16th. In North America, Spider-Man: No Way Home, Spider-Man, Spider-Man: Far From Home, Spider-Man 2, Spider-Man 3 and Spider-Man: Homecoming are ranked 2nd, 14th, 15th, 17th, 19th, and 22nd for all superhero films. Worldwide, Spider-Man: No Way Home, Spider-Man: Far From Home, Spider-Man 3, and Spider-Man: Homecoming are ranked 3rd, 11th, 16th, and 17th for all superhero films. The Raimi-trilogy and the MCU films (Homecoming, Far From Home, and No Way Home) are six of the seven most successful films produced by Sony/Columbia Pictures in North America, with No Way Home becoming Sony's highest-grossing film both in North America and worldwide.

Critical and public response

David Ansen of Newsweek enjoyed Spider-Man as a fun film to watch, though he considered Spider-Man 2 to be "a little too self-important for its own good." Ansen saw Spider-Man 3 as a return to form, finding it "the most grandiose chapter and the nuttiest." Tom Charity of CNN appreciated the films' "solidly redemptive moral convictions", also noting the vast improvement of the visual effects from the first film to the third. While he saw the second film's Doc Ock as the "most engaging" villain, he applauded the third film's Sandman as "a triumph of CGI wizardry." Richard Corliss of Time enjoyed the action of the films and thought that they did better than most action movies by "rethinking the characters, the franchise and the genre."

Colin Covert of the Star Tribune praised Spider-Man as a "superb debut" of the superhero as well as Spider-Man 2 as a "superior sequel" for filmgoers who are fans "of spectacle and of story." Covert expressed disappointment in Spider-Man 3 as too ambitious with the multiple storylines leaving one "feeling overstuffed yet shortchanged." Manohla Dargis of The New York Times enjoyed the humor of the first two films, but found it missing in the third installment. Dargis also noted, "The bittersweet paradox of this franchise is that while the stories have grown progressively less interesting the special effects have improved tremendously." Robert Denerstein of the Rocky Mountain News ranked the films from his favorite to his least favorite: Spider-Man 2, Spider-Man, and Spider-Man 3. While Denerstein missed the presence of Alfred Molina as Doctor Octopus from the second film, he found the third film – despite being "bigger, though not necessarily better" – to have a "satisfying conclusion."

See also
 List of accolades received by the 2002–2007 Spider-Man film series
 List of films based on Marvel Comics
 Spider-Man in television
 3 Dev Adam ("Three Giant Men"), 1973 Turkish film featuring an unauthorized depiction of Spider-Man

Notes

References

External links
 Spider-Man film franchise overview at Box Office Mojo
 

 
Film series introduced in 1977
Sony Pictures franchises
Columbia Pictures franchises
Marvel Entertainment franchises